The Schempp-Hirth Discus-2 is a Standard Class sailplane produced by Schempp-Hirth since 1998.  It replaced the highly successful Schempp-Hirth Discus.

Design and development
In plan view the almost crescent shape of the leading edge is similar to the Discus but is tapered in three stages. An entirely new wing section is used. The dihedral towards the tips was greatly increased compared with the Discus. Winglets are an optional extra. A version with a narrow fuselage is called the Discus-2a and the wider fuselage version is called the 2b. The fuselage was specifically designed to be highly crash resistant. In U.S. Air Force service the Discus-2b is known as the TG-15B.

The Discus-2 has also been successful though the competition from the Rolladen-Schneider LS8 and the Alexander Schleicher ASW 28 has meant that the Discus-2 has not sold in such great numbers as its predecessor, which went unchallenged for many years.

18 metre version
A version with an 18-metre span, with the option of smaller wing tips to fly as a Standard Class glider,  was launched in 2004 and designated Discus-2c.
When fitted with a small sustaining engine (turbo) it is designated Discus-2cT.

Variants
Discus-2a
Production variant with 15 metre wingspan and narrow cockpit. 0.54 m (1.77 ft) in width, 0.75 m (2.46 ft) in height.
Discus-2b
Production variant with 15 metre wingspan and wider cockpit. 0.62 m (2.03 ft) in width, 0.81 m (2.66 ft) in height.
Discus-2T
"Turbo" variant with 15 metre wingspan and a 15.3 kW (20.5 hp) SOLO 2350 2-stroke, 2 cylinder sustainer engine. 
Discus-2c
Production variant with 15 metre or 18 metre wingspan.
Discus-2cT
"Turbo" variant with 15 metre or 18 metre wingspan and a 15.3 kW (20.5 hp) SOLO 2350 2-stroke, 2 cylinder sustainer engine.
Discus-2c FES
Production variant with 15 metre or 18 metre wingspan equipped with a front electric sustainer.

Specifications (Discus-2a)

See also

References

External links

 Schempp-Hirth Discus 2c

1990s German sailplanes
Discus 2
Electric aircraft
T-tail aircraft
Motor gliders
Aircraft first flown in 1997

de:Schempp-Hirth Discus